Cottonworth is a small village in the Test Valley district of Hampshire, England. The village lies on the A3057 road between Andover and Romsey. According to the PostOffice the 2011 Census population was included in the civil parish of Wherwell.  Its nearest town is Andover, which lies approximately 4 miles (6.5 km) north from the village. Cottonworth is also the site of Cottonworth Vineyards, which produces award-winning English sparkling wine from the vineyards surrounding the village.

Villages in Hampshire
Test Valley